Qosun (also Romanized as Qoşūn) is a village in Takab Rural District, Kuhsorkh County, Razavi Khorasan Province, Iran. At the 2006 census, its population was 496, in 130 families.

References 

Populated places in Kuhsorkh County